Joseph Alfred Duncan (born 10 March 1993) is a Ghanaian professional footballer who plays for Fiorentina as a midfielder.

Club career

Internazionale
Duncan began training with Inter Milan in the summer 2010. But due to FIFA regulations, he formally joined Inter in March 2011, after his 18th birthday. During that time, he lived in Inter training centre "Centro Sportivo Giacinto Facchetti" in Milan. Duncan made his Serie A debut for Inter in August 2012.

Sampdoria
On 19 July 2014, Duncan joined fellow Serie A side Sampdoria from Inter Milan for two seasons, until 30 June 2016. Duncan moved permanently in January 2015 with Sampdoria paying a transfer fee of about €3 million and Duncan signing a -year contract.

Sassuolo
On 23 July 2015, Duncan was signed by Sassuolo on a temporary deal, with an obligation to sign him outright at the end of season from Sampdoria, for about €6 million. On 6 March 2016, Duncan scored his first goal for the club against A.C. Milan in a 2–0 win.

Fiorentina
On 31 January 2020, Duncan joined Fiorentina on loan with an obligation to buy.

Cagliari
On 17 January 2021, Duncan joined Cagliari on loan until 30 June 2021 with an option to buy.

International career
Duncan represented Ghana at the 2013 FIFA U-20 World Cup in Turkey playing four games during it. He made his full international debut on 14 November 2012 against Cape Verde.

Career statistics

Club

International

Honours
Inter Primavera
 Campionato Nazionale Primavera: 2011–12
 NextGen series: 2011–12

Ghana U20
FIFA U-20 World Cup: bronze medal in 2013

References

External links

 Profile at the ACF Fiorentina website 
 

1993 births
Living people
Footballers from Accra
Ghanaian footballers
Association football midfielders
Inter Milan players
U.S. Livorno 1915 players
U.C. Sampdoria players
U.S. Sassuolo Calcio players
ACF Fiorentina players
Cagliari Calcio players
Serie A players
Serie B players
Ghana under-20 international footballers
Ghana international footballers
Ghanaian expatriate footballers
Ghanaian expatriate sportspeople in Italy
Expatriate footballers in Italy